Joe's World is an American sitcom that aired on NBC from December 28, 1979 to July 26, 1980.

Premise
Joe is a hardworking house painter with a wife and five kids, yet he is deeply unhappy.

Cast
Ramon Bieri as Joe Wabash
K Callan as Katie Wabash
Christopher Knight as Steve Wabash
Melissa Sherman as Maggie Wabash
Michael Sharrett as Jimmy Wabash
Ari Zeltzer as Rick Wabash
Missy Francis as Linda Wabash
Russ Banham as Brad Hopkins
Misty Rowe as Judy Wilson
Frank Coppola as Andy, a friend of Joe's

Episodes

References

External links
IMDb
TV.com
TV Guide

1979 American television series debuts
1980 American television series endings
1970s American sitcoms
1980s American sitcoms
English-language television shows
NBC original programming
Television series by Sony Pictures Television
Television shows set in Detroit